Caguioa is a surname. Notable people with the surname include:

Alfredo Benjamin Caguioa (born 1959), Filipino lawyer
Mark Caguioa (born 1979), Filipino basketball player